Gvardeysky is a rural locality (a khutor) in Zakharovskoye Rural Settlement, Kletsky District, Volgograd Oblast, Russia. The population was 193 as of 2010. There are 11 streets.

Geography 
Gvardeysky is located 32 km southwest of Kletskaya (the district's administrative centre) by road. Zakharov is the nearest rural locality.

References 

Rural localities in Kletsky District